Anton Karlsson (born August 3, 1996) is a Swedish professional ice hockey forward who is currently playing with Storhamar Ishockey in the Eliteserien (Norway). He was selected in the 5th round (164th overall) by Lokomotiv Yaroslavl in the 2013 KHL Junior Draft and was also drafted by the Arizona Coyotes in the third round (87th overall) of the 2014 NHL Entry Draft.

Playing career
At the age of 17, Karlsson made his professional debut on loan from Frölunda HC with the Mora IK of HockeyAllsvenskan during the 2013–14 season, appearing in 9 scoreless games.

Karlsson made his Swedish Hockey League debut playing with Skellefteå AIK during the 2014–15 SHL season, playing in 6 games for 1 assist before returning to Frölunda HC mid-season on November 29, 2014.

On April 23, 2017, Karlsson left Frölunda for a second time, signing a two-year contract with former team, Leksands IF of the Allsvenskan.

International play

Karlsson captained the Swedish team at the 2013 Ivan Hlinka Memorial Tournament, and won a silver medal playing with Team Sweden at the 2014 World Junior Ice Hockey Championships.

Personal
Anton is the younger brother of Erik Karlsson, who also currently plays for Modo Hockey in the HockeyAllsvenskan (Allsv).

Career statistics

Regular season and playoffs

International

Awards and honours

References

External links

1996 births
Living people
AIK IF players
Arizona Coyotes draft picks
Bofors IK players
Frölunda HC players
Leksands IF players
Mora IK players
People from Lerum Municipality
IK Oskarshamn players
Skellefteå AIK players
Storhamar Dragons players
Swedish ice hockey forwards
Sportspeople from Västra Götaland County
EC VSV players